C. bovis may refer to:
 Corynebacterium bovis, a pathogenic veterinary bacterium that causes mastitis and pyelonephritis in cattle
 Cryptosporidium bovis, a bacterium species in the genus Cryptosporidium
 Chryseobacterium bovis, a bacterium species
 Cyclaspis bovis, a crustacean species in the genus Cyclaspis

See also
 Bovis (disambiguation)